Kintu Musoke (born 5 August 1938) is a Ugandan politician, closely associated with President Yoweri Museveni. He served as Prime Minister of Uganda from 18 November 1994 to 5 April 1999. He was later appointed to head a task force on fighting AIDS in Uganda.
He also serves as an Advisor to the President of Uganda.

Background and education
Kintu Musoke was born in Masaka District to Yafeesi Kintu and Eseza Nassiwa on 8 May 1938. He attended Kabungo Native Anglican Church School and Buwere Primary School. He transferred to Kings College Budo for his O-Level and A-Level education. He holds he degree of Bachelor of Arts in Political Science, Philosophy and Journalism, obtained from Delhi University in India.

Career
Following his graduation from university in 1963, he returned to Uganda and entered politics as a UPC youth mobilizer. In 1965, he was expelled from the party together with the other members belonging to a faction led by the UPC's Secretary General John Kakonge. He then abstained from politics until 1980, when he participated in the formation of the Uganda Patriotic Movement, which eventually morphed into the National Resistance Movement. During his lifetime, he has worked with several newspapers, including Uganda Eyogera, Uganda Argus, The African Pilot and Weekly Topic.

See also
 Jaberi Bidandi Ssali
 Kirunda Kivejinja
 Yoweri Museveni
 Cabinet of Uganda

References

External links
 Bidandi Raps Museveni In Book

1938 births
Living people
Prime Ministers of Uganda
National Resistance Movement politicians
Ganda people
People from Masaka District
Delhi University alumni